Bhairahawa Gladiators is a professional cricket franchise team based in Bhairahawa city, Nepal which participates in the Everest Premier League. Under the leadership of captain Sharad Vesawkar, they reached the finals of 2017 and 2018 edition of the league which they lost to Biratnagar Warriors 
and Lalitpur Patriots by 1 and 14 runs respectively.

Squad

Players with international caps are listed in bold.

Coaching Staff

Statistics

Season By Season

Last updated: 31 December 2020

Legend's
Y=Year
P=Played
W=Wins
L=Losses
T=Tied
NR=No result
WP=Winning percentage
PO=Position

Tournament Standing

References

Everest Premier League
Cricket in Nepal
2017 establishments in Nepal